Qnaiouer, or Knaywer, or Qnaywer is a village in the North Governorate of Lebanon. It is located in the Bsharri District about 36 mi (or 58 km) North-East of Beirut, the country's capital. The city is composed mainly of Maronite Catholic people.

External links

References

Maronite Christian communities in Lebanon